Jonathan D. Krane (May 1, 1952 – August 1, 2016) was an American screenwriter, film producer, talent manager, and studio head.  He's most known in Hollywood for his decade and a half partnership with John Travolta, whom he managed from 1987 until 2002.  Together, they made some of Travolta's biggest films including Look Who's Talking (1989), Phenomenon (1996), Michael (1996), Face/Off (1997), Primary Colors (1998), General's Daughter (1999), Domestic Disturbance (2001), Swordfish (2001) and Basic (2003).

Krane was born in Hollywood, CA, on May 1, 1952.  He graduated from Hollywood Hills High School at the age of 15, and received his bachelor's degree in liberal arts at St. John's College.  After finishing his undergraduate work, he lived for one year in England, France, and Greece, independently studying civil liberties in European criminal justice systems before returning to the states to study law at Yale Law School.  He was awarded his Doctor of Jurisprudence in 1976.

He began his legal career as an associate at Los Angeles law firm of Irell & Manella, specializing in international motion picture taxation and entertainment law.  This specialty would expose him to the world of entertainment and set him up for his future career as a talent manager and film producer.

He married actress Sally Kellerman on May 11, 1980, in a private ceremony at Jennifer Jones' Malibu home.  In 1989, they adopted newborn twins, Jack and Hannah. The family resided part-time in Jupiter, Florida from 1991 to 2008.

A chance meeting with Blake Edwards at an industry party would change the course of his career.  Edwards was reportedly tired of working with the studio system and Krane pitched him his idea for a "new type of film studio."  After further discussions, they partnered together to form Blake Edwards Entertainment, where Krane would serve as CEO.  Krane would develop and produce the projects so Edwards could focus on writing and directing.

Their first project was the hit film Trail of the Pink Panther, which they followed up with Curse of the Pink Panther the next year.  All told, they made seven films together before Jonathan left to expand his own company called Management Company Entertainment (MCE), which he had formed in 1983.  The separation was not amicable, with Blake later saying he "was furious with Krane and no longer spoke to him because Krane had made all his contacts through Edwards and then left."

Krane took MCE public in 1987 as "Management Co. Entertainment Group", which made him the youngest CEO of a publicly traded company at the time.

Filmography

References

External links

American film producers
1952 births
2016 deaths